Aleix Gómez Abelló (born 7 May 1997) is a Spanish handball player for FC Barcelona and the Spain national team. He started to play in inferior categories of the team called Finetwork (Gijón)

He participated at the 2019 World Men's Handball Championship.

International honours
EHF Champions League:
Winner: 2021, 2022

IHF Super Globe:
Winner: 2017, 2018, 2019

Junior World Championship:
Gold Medalist: 2017

Junior European Championship:
Gold Medalist: 2016

Individual awards 
 All-Star Right Wing at the Olympic Games: 2020
All-Star Right Wing of the European Championship: 2022
All-Star Right Wing of EHF Champions League: 2021, 2022
Top Goalscorer of EHF Champions League: 2022 (104 goals)
 Best Young Player of EHF Champions League: 2020
All-Star Right Wing of the Junior World Championship: 2017

References

External links

1997 births
Living people
Sportspeople from Sabadell
Spanish male handball players
Liga ASOBAL players
FC Barcelona Handbol players
Handball players from Catalonia
Handball players at the 2020 Summer Olympics
Medalists at the 2020 Summer Olympics
Olympic bronze medalists for Spain
Olympic medalists in handball
Competitors at the 2018 Mediterranean Games
Mediterranean Games bronze medalists for Spain
Mediterranean Games medalists in handball